Philautus vermiculatus is a species of frog in the family Rhacophoridae.
It is found in Malaysia and Thailand.
Its natural habitats are subtropical or tropical moist lowland forests and subtropical or tropical moist montane forests.
It is threatened by habitat loss.

References

External links
Amphibian and Reptiles of Peninsular Malaysia - Philautus vermiculatus

vermiculatus
Amphibians described in 1900
Taxonomy articles created by Polbot